Belships is a bulk carrier operator and ship management company, listed on the Oslo Stock Exchange. The company has head offices in Oslo, Norway and a management subsidiary in Singapore.

Belships operates three bulk ships of its own and manages 12 ships owned by Elkem Chartering, in which Belships owns a 50% share. Belships operates other ships on bareboat or time charter.

Christen Smith founded the company in 1918 as Skibsaktieselskabet Christen Smiths Rederi, a pioneering heavy lift specialist. In 1937 the company was restructured, the brothers Axel, Frithjof and Jørgen Lorentzen took a controlling share and the company became listed on the Oslo Stock Exchange.

In the 1960s the company changed its specialism from heavy lift to bulk cargo. In 2018 Belships merged with the Lighthouse companies and the Lorentzen family ended its involvement with the company.

References

Bibliography

External links

Commercial management shipping companies
Companies listed on the Oslo Stock Exchange
Dry bulk shipping companies
Transport companies established in 1918
Shipping companies of Norway
Norwegian companies established in 1918